Welcome to Curiosity is a 2018 British crime thriller film directed by Ben Pickering and starring Amrita Acharia, Jack Ashton, Richard Blackwood, Kacey Clarke, Lili Bordán, Stephen Marcus and Finn Corney.  It is the world's first film to have raised its entire production budget through equity crowdfunding.

Cast
Amrita Acharia as Zoe/Lee Hunting
Jack Ashton as Sean
Richard Blackwood as Fordy
Kacey Clarke as Martine
Brian Croucher as Ernest Stubbs
Gary Grant as Tim
Cristian Solimeno as Dexter
Terry Sweeney as Lewis
Eke Chukwu as Al
O’Ar Pali as DS Binon
Darren Ripley as DI Jackson
Monty Burgess as Topic
Lara Heller as Duffy
Finn Corney as Elliott
Lily Joseph as Holly
Christopher Rithin as Thomas
Sofya Skya as Alina
Lili Bordán as Dr Jones
Stephen Marcus as Max
Danny Howard as OZ
Eloise Dale as Julie
Nigel Billing as Nigel
Jon Campling as Sid
Duncan Casey as Derrick
Sean Cronin as Nikolai

Production

Principal photography began on 29 April 2014 and concluded on 31 October 2014. Filmed on location in Cornwall, Kent and London. Prominent locations included Goonhilly Satellite Earth Station on Cornwall’s Lizard peninsula, Mimi's Vintage Diner in Bugle and Fort Borstal outside Rochester, Kent.

The film's £200,000 ($240,000) budget was raised in three rounds of equity crowdfunding by producers Ben Pickering and Darren Ripley.

References

External links

2018 films
British crime thriller films
Films shot in England
Films shot in Cornwall
2010s English-language films
2010s British films